Leicestershire 1 was a tier 10 English Rugby Union league with teams from Leicestershire taking part.  Promoted teams moved up to East Midlands/Leicestershire 1 and relegated teams dropped to Leicestershire 2.  The league ran for two spells between 1987–1992 and 1996–1998 before it was permanently cancelled and the majority of teams transferred into either East Midlands/Leicestershire 1 or East Midlands/Leicestershire 2.

Original teams

When league rugby began in 1987, this division contained the following teams:

Belgrave
Coalville
Kibworth
Lutterworth
Market Bosworth
Old Ashbeians
Old Bosworthians
Old Newtonians
West Leicester

Leicestershire 1 honours

Leicestershire 1 (1987–1992)

The original Leicestershire 1 was a tier 8 league.  Promotion was to East Midlands/Leicestershire and relegation to Leicestershire 2. At the end of the 1991–92 season all of the East Midlands and Leicestershire leagues were merged and most sides in Leicestershire 1 transferred to the new East Midlands/Leicestershire 1.

Leicestershire 1 (1996-1998)

After an absence of four seasons Leicestershire 1 was reintroduced, this time sitting at tier 10 of the league system.  Promotion was to East Midlands/Leicestershire 1 and there was no relegation.  Remerging of all the East Midlands and Leicestershire leagues meant that Leicestershire 1 was cancelled at the end of the 1997–98 season and the majority of teams transferred into East Midlands/Leicestershire 2.

Number of league titles

Belgrave (1)
Coalville (1)
Hinckley (1)
Loughborough Students (1)
Lutterworth (1)
South Leicester (1)
Wigston (1)

Notes

See also
Leicestershire 2
Midlands RFU
Leicestershire RU
English rugby union system
Rugby union in England

References

External links
Leicestershire Rugby Union website

10
Rugby union in Leicestershire
Sports leagues established in 1987
Sports leagues disestablished in 1998